Maturin may refer to:

Places
 Maturín, city in the state of Monagas in Venezuela
 Maturin Airport
 Maturín Municipality, Monagas, Venezuela

People

Given name
 Maturin Murray Ballou (1820–1895), American writer and publisher

 Maturin Cordier (Corderius) (c. 1479–1564), French-Swiss theologian, teacher, humanist, and pedagogue
 Maturin Veyssière La Croze (1661–1739), French Benedictine historian, orientalist, royal librarian and professor
 Maturin Le Petit (1693–1739), French Jesuit priest and missionary
 Maturin Livingston (1769–1847), American lawyer and politician from New York
 Maturin Livingston Jr. (1816–1888), American merchant, son of the above

Surname
 Basil W. Maturin (1847–1915), Irish-American-British priest and writer 
 Charles Robert Maturin (1782–1824), Irish author
 Edward Maturin (1812–1881), Irish-born American poet, novelist and professor of Greek
 Eric Maturin (1883–1957), British actor
 Gabriel Maturin (died 1746), Irish Anglican Dean of Kildare from 1737 to 1745 and Dean of St Patrick's Cathedral from 1745 to 1746
 Henry Maturin (1842–1920), Irish cricketer
 Óscar Maturín (born 1979), Mexican footballer
 Peter Maturin, Anglican priest, Dean of Killala from 1724 until 1741 and Vicar-general of the Diocese of Killala and Achonry
 William Maturin (1814–1889), senior public servant in Australia and Great Britain

Fictional characters
 Stephen Maturin, a ship's doctor in Patrick O'Brian's Aubrey–Maturin book series
 Maturin, a guardian of the beams in Stephen King's The Dark Tower and It

See also
 Mathurin (disambiguation)